Evžen Čermák (25 October 1932 – 19 April 2018) was a Czech alpine skier. He competed in three events at the 1956 Winter Olympics.

References

1932 births
2018 deaths
Czech male alpine skiers
Olympic alpine skiers of Czechoslovakia
Alpine skiers at the 1956 Winter Olympics
Sportspeople from Jablonec nad Nisou